Division No. 17 is one of eighteen census divisions in the province of Saskatchewan, Canada, as defined by Statistics Canada. It is located in the west-northwest part of the province, bordering Alberta. The most populous community in this division is the interprovincial city of Lloydminster. Another important population centre is the town of Meadow Lake.

Demographics 

Census subdivisions 
The following census subdivisions (municipalities or municipal equivalents) are located within Saskatchewan's Division No. 17.

Cities
Lloydminster
Meadow Lake

Towns
Lashburn
Maidstone
Marshall
St. Walburg
Turtleford

Villages

Dorintosh
Edam
Glaslyn
Goodsoil
Loon Lake
Makwa
Meota
Mervin
Paradise Hill
Paynton
Pierceland
Waseca

Resort villages

Aquadeo
Cochin
Greig Lake
Kivimaa-Moonlight Bay
Metinota

Rural municipalities

 RM No. 468 Meota
 RM No. 469 Turtle River
 RM No. 470 Paynton
 RM No. 471 Eldon
 RM No. 472 Wilton
 RM No. 498 Parkdale
 RM No. 499 Mervin
 RM No. 501 Frenchman Butte
 RM No. 502 Brittania
 RM No. 561 Loon Lake
 RM No. 588 Meadow Lake
 RM No. 622 Beaver River

Indian reserves

 Big Island Lake Cree Nation
 Eagles Lake 165C
 Flying Dust First Nation 105
 Makaoo 120
 Makwa Lake 129
 Makwa Lake 129A
 Makwa Lake 129B
 Makwa Lake 129C
 Meadow Lake 105A
 Min-A-He-Quo-Sis 116C
 Ministikwan 161
 Ministikwan 161A
 Moosomin 112B
 Saulteaux 159
 Seekaskootch 119
 Thunderchild First Nation 115B
 Thunderchild First Nation 115C
 Thunderchild First Nation 115D
 Waterhen 130

See also 
List of census divisions of Saskatchewan
List of communities in Saskatchewan

References

Division No. 17, Saskatchewan Statistics Canada

 
17